Gypogyna is a genus of jumping spiders that occurs in Colombia, Brazil, Paraguay, and Argentina. Its only species is Gypogyna forceps.

References

Salticidae
Monotypic Salticidae genera
Spiders of South America
Fauna of Paraguay
Taxa named by Eugène Simon